The Acropolis International Tournament 2009 was a basketball tournament held in OAKA Indoor Hall in Athens, Greece, from August 24 until August 26, 2009. This was the 23rd edition of the Acropolis International Basketball Tournament. The four participating teams were Greece, Lithuania, Russia and Serbia.

Venues

Participating teams

Standings 

|-bgcolor="gold"

|}

Results 
All times are local Central European Summer Time (UTC+2).

Final standing

References

External links

Acropolis Cup 2009 Results

Acropolis International Basketball Tournament
2009–10 in Greek basketball
2009–10 in Serbian basketball
2009–10 in Lithuanian basketball
2009–10 in Russian basketball